Jens Wöhrmann (born 8 September 1967) is a former professional tennis player from Germany.

Career
Wöhrmann had a win over world number nine Jakob Hlasek en route to a semi-final exit at the Stuttgart Outdoor tournament in 1989. He finished the season well, making the quarter-finals in Frankfurt and in the Stockholm Open. 

Now ranked in the top 100, Wöhrmann gained direct entry into the 1990 Australian Open, his first Grand Slam appearance. He defeated Soviet player Andres Võsand in the opening round, then lost in four sets to Lars-Anders Wahlgren. At the 1990 Wimbledon Championships he also made the second round, where he was beaten by Milan Šrejber. He had defeated American Brian Garrow in the first round. In the 1990 BMW Open he had two big wins, over Yannick Noah (for the second time in his career) and countryman Carl-Uwe Steeb. He lost to Petr Korda in the quarter-finals. Also that year, Wöhrmann represented West Germany in a Davis Cup tie against Argentina in Buenos Aires. The German played the first rubber, against Alberto Mancini, which he lost.

Challenger titles

Singles: (1)

Doubles: (1)

References

1967 births
Living people
West German male tennis players
German male tennis players
Sportspeople from Siegen
Tennis people from North Rhine-Westphalia